Mustafa Lutfullah (born 15 December 1961), is a Bangladeshi politician. He has served as a member of the Jatiyo Sangshad since 2014, representing Satkhira-1 for the Workers Party of Bangladesh

Background
Lutfullah is a lawyer by profession. He is also a politician

References

Living people
1961 births
Workers Party of Bangladesh politicians
10th Jatiya Sangsad members
Bangladeshi communists
20th-century Bangladeshi lawyers
21st-century Bangladeshi lawyers
11th Jatiya Sangsad members